Paranthrene robiniae, the western poplar clearwing, is a moth of the family Sesiidae. It is found from sea level to near the timber line from Alaska southward along the Pacific Coast to southern California and throughout the Rocky Mountains into the desert southwest and as far east as Kansas and North Dakota.

The wingspan is 23–30 mm for males and 30–36 mm for females. Adults are yellow-black, with orange brown forewings with somewhat darker veins. The hindwings are transparent with a conspicuous deep yellow discal mark and fringed with dark brown scales. Adults emerge mostly from March to August, depending on location. In central California, most emerge by mid June, in eastern Washington as late as mid September and in the extreme southern range in California, specimens have been taken from February to May and again in November.

The larvae feed on poplar, willow and birch. Poplars are generally favoured, although willows seem preferred in some areas of California and Oregon. Black cottonwood, balsam poplar, and white poplar, as well as several hybrids poplars, are also recorded as hosts. Newly hatched larvae crawl over the bark for a few hours before selecting suitable sites to begin feeding. The larvae initially excavate cavities in the phloem and cambium and later galleries into the wood. The larvae feed during two successive summer and fall seasons. The first winter in the galleries, which are loosely packed with frass and the second winter in pupal chambers near the distal ends of the galleries. These distal ends are capped with silk, but no cocoons are formed. Pupation lasts two to three weeks. A generation requires two years over most of its range but may be of shorter duration in its southern range.

References

Sesiidae
Moths described in 1880